This is a list of observatory codes (IAU codes or MPC codes) published by the Minor Planet Center. For a detailed description, see observations of small Solar System bodies.

List

References
 
 

Astronomy-related lists
Technology-related lists